Ralph of Coucy, (c. 1134 – 1191), lord of Coucy, lord of Marle, La Fère, Crécy (sur-Serre), Vervins, Pinon, Landouzy (la-Ville), and Fontaine (lès-Vervins).  He was the son of Enguerrand II, Lord of Coucy and Agnes de Beaugency.

History
Ralph married Agnes of Hainault, daughter of Baldwin IV Count of Hainault.
They had:
Ada, married Dirk van Beveren
Yolande, married Robert II of Dreux

Ralph married the second time to Alix II of Dreux, daughter Agnès de Baudement, Countess of Braine, and Robert I, Count of Dreux.
They had:
Enguerrand III, Lord of Coucy (d.1243)
Thomas, lord of Vervines (d.1252/3)
Agnes (d.1214)

By his later marriage, Ralph became cousin to Philip II of France. He attended the King of France in 1181 during the war against Philip I, Count of Flanders. He left for the Holy Land, where he died in the siege of Acre in November 1191.

References

1130s births
1191 deaths
Christians of the Third Crusade
Lords of Coucy